Andrzej Kryński (born 16 July 1931) is a Polish former fencer. He competed in the team épée event at the 1960 Summer Olympics.

References

External links
  

1931 births
Possibly living people
Polish male fencers
Olympic fencers of Poland
Fencers at the 1960 Summer Olympics
People from Pruszków County
Sportspeople from Masovian Voivodeship